Toghay (also Romanized as Toghāy and Ţoghāy) is a village in Qezel Uzan Rural District, in the Central District of Meyaneh County, East Azerbaijan Province, Iran. At the 2006 census, its population was 124, in 25 families.

References 

Populated places in Meyaneh County